Doso may refer to:
 An alias of Demeter in Greek mythology
 Doso (Buddhism), a lower-ranking "hall monk" in the Japanese Tendai school of Buddhism
 Doso language an unclassified language spoken in Papua New Guinea